The I-10 Twin Span Bridge, a nearly  causeway officially known as the Frank Davis "Naturally N'Awlins" Memorial Bridge, consists of two parallel trestle bridges. These parallel bridges cross the eastern end of Lake Pontchartrain in southern Louisiana from New Orleans to Slidell.  The current bridge spans were constructed in the second half of the 2000s after the original bridges were extensively damaged by Hurricane Katrina on August 29, 2005. The first span opened to eastbound traffic on July 9, 2009. On April 7, 2010, the second span was opened to traffic and the old twin spans were permanently closed to traffic.

The approaches to the westbound lanes were completed with a ribbon-cutting ceremony on September 8, 2011, and the opening of all six lanes the next morning. The original Twin Span bridges were demolished shortly after the replacement spans opened. A short portion remains in use as a public fishing pier in Slidell. The debris from the demolition was used to line the nearby lake bottom as an underwater reef.

On August 1, 2014, the bridge was officially named the Frank Davis "Naturally N'Awlins" Memorial Bridge to honor the former WWL-TV News personality Frank Joseph Davis (1942–2013) who often fished near the bridge.

Original Twin Span
The original bridges were opened at a short ceremony on December 21, 1965 and were each constructed with 433 65-foot concrete segments.

Hurricane Katrina
After Hurricane Katrina on August 29, 2005, the old Twin Spans suffered extensive damage, as the rising storm surge pulled or shifted bridge segments off their piers.  The eastbound span was missing 38 segments with another 170 misaligned, while the westbound span was missing 26 segments with 265 misaligned.  The damage to the Twin Spans and to U.S. Route 90 to the east left only one route into New Orleans from the east, the U.S. Route 11 bridge just west of the Twin Spans.  The Louisiana Department of Transportation & Development (DOTD) accepted a bid of $30.9 million from Boh Brothers Construction Company on September 9, 2005 to reconstruct the bridges, starting with the less damaged westbound span.  Phase 1 of the project was to reestablish two-way traffic on the eastbound span within 45 days. Scavenged bridge segments from the westbound span were used to fill in the gaps in the eastbound span.   On October 10, 2005, the east span was reopened to traffic with one lane in each direction. The original contract planned for 43 days - the contractor completed the project 15 days ahead of schedule and was awarded a bonus of $1.1 million.    Phase 2 of the project was occurring concurrently with Phase 1 and involved repairs to the westbound span.  Prefabricated steel bridge spans were used on the westbound bridge in two areas to replace destroyed segments and segments used on the eastbound span.  The west span reopened on January 6, 2006, returning four lanes of traffic to flow once again.  Due to the prefabricated steel segments, there were both a -per-hour speed limit and weight restrictions on the westbound span.  Additionally, the span was closed periodically for maintenance work, which is covered by Phase 3 of the original contract.

Current Twin Span
Following the extensive damages from Hurricane Katrina, it was decided that the old Twin Spans were too vulnerable to storm surge and that the long term solution would be to construct two new spans.

The wider bridges eliminated the bottlenecking that occurred at both ends of the old bridges and also are able to accommodate 50 percent more traffic than the old twin spans, according to the Louisiana Department of Transportation and Development. The current bridges also feature traffic cameras and electronic message boards to alert motorists of any potential problems on the bridge, much like the Lake Pontchartrain Causeway bridge.

Construction accident
One of the workers, Eric Troy Blackmon, who was tethered to the girder, died in the accident.

See also
 
 
 
 List of bridges in the United States
 List of longest bridges

References

External links
 The New Twin Span Bridge website (archive.org)
 Lawsuit filed in Twin Span Bridge collapse case

Bridges in New Orleans
Buildings and structures in St. Tammany Parish, Louisiana
Bridges completed in 1965
Bridges completed in 2010
Road bridges in Louisiana
Interstate 10
Bridges on the Interstate Highway System
Transportation in St. Tammany Parish, Louisiana
Slidell, Louisiana
Concrete bridges in the United States
Trestle bridges in the United States